Striomecyna bimaculicollis is a species of beetle in the family Cerambycidae, and the only species in the genus Striomecyna. It was described by Breuning in 1957.

References

Desmiphorini
Beetles described in 1957
Monotypic beetle genera